Law Library Resource Xchange is a free monthly e-journal, founded in 1996, owned, edited and published by a solo law/business librarian, researcher, and expert knowledge strategist. Content is written by the editor, as well as law librarians, attorneys, academics, law students and other information professionals. LLRX publishes a weekly column on cyber-crime, cybersecurity and privacy ,  articles on Internet research, technology-related issues, technology-related resources, and technology-related tools. Its archives include Resource Centers on Comparative and Foreign Law, International Law, Search Engines, and State and Federal Legislation, with over 1,400 browsable and searchable sources for state and federal court rules, forms and dockets, and a wide range of resources related to the September 11, 2001 terrorist attacks.

Recognition 
 American Library Association Award/Grant, 2009

References

External links 
 

Legal research
Legal bibliographies